Boss is the internal name for a family of large-displacement V8 engines from Ford Motor Company intended to compete with Chrysler Hemi engines and General Motors' 6.0 L Vortec engines. Originally, Ford developed the engine architecture under the name Hurricane; however, development of the engine was delayed due to its temporary cancellation in 2005. It was revived in early 2006 by Mark Fields and was given the new name of Boss in light of the devastation caused by Hurricane Katrina in 2005. In spite of this change, Ford did not officially market the engines with the Boss name in any production vehicle where they were used, instead referring to the engines by their displacement.

The first (and ultimately only) modern Boss engine, a 6.2 L V8, was produced at Ford's Romeo Engine Plant in Romeo, Michigan.

Ford Australia and Ford Performance Vehicles used the "Boss" name for V8 engines from 2002, but these were variations of the Ford Modular V8 with locally produced parts.

6.2 L

The  V8 is the main variant of the Boss engine. The V8 shares design similarities with the Modular Engine family such as a deep-skirt block with cross-bolted main caps, crankshaft-driven gerotor oil pump, overhead cam valve train arrangement, and bellhousing bolt pattern. In particular, the 6.2 L features a two-valve per cylinder SOHC valve train with roller-rocker shafts, hemispherical heads, and two spark plugs per cylinder, as well as dual-equal variable cam timing. Just as notable is that they use a much wider  bore spacing (compared to the Modular's ), allowing for the use of larger bore diameters and valves. It has lightweight aluminum cylinder heads and pistons, but makes use of a cast-iron cylinder block for extra durability since most applications for the engine will be trucks.

This V8 went into production in early 2010 and debuted in the 2010 Ford F-150 SVT Raptor as a late-availability option. For the 2011 model year, the 6.2 L V8 was introduced in Ford's Super Duty pickups as a replacement for both the 5.4 L Triton V8 and the 6.8 L Triton V10, and in the F-150 as the premium engine option, though it was not available in all configurations.

It was also now mated to Ford's TorqShift G 6 speed transmission; Ford's Live-Drive Power Takeoff (PTO) Provision with Mobile Mode is also optional on 6.2 L equipped trucks. 

Applications for the 16-valve SOHC VCT 6.2 L V8 include:
 2010–2012 F-150 HD Harley-Davidson
 2010–2014 F-150 Raptor,  @ 5500 rpm,  @ 4500 rpm
 2011–2014 Ford F-Series,  @ 5500 rpm,  @ 4500 rpm
 2011–2016 Ford F-Series Super Duty,  @ 5500 rpm,  @ 4500 rpm
 2017–2022 Ford F-Series Super Duty,  @ 5750 rpm,  @ 3800 rpm
2017–2019 Ford E-Series

See also
 List of Ford engines
 Ford Boss 302 engine
 Ford Boss 351 engine
 Willys Hurricane engine

References

B
V8 engines
Gasoline engines by model